Baroness Casey may refer to:

 Maie Casey, Baroness Casey (1892–1983), Australian pioneer aviator, poet, librettist, biographer, memoirist and artist
 Louise Casey, Baroness Casey of Blackstock (born 1965), British government official